Brianna Beamish (born 4 September 1993 Surrey, Canada) is a Canadian volleyball player. She was part of the Canada women's national volleyball team, and participated at the 2017 FIVB Volleyball Women's World Grand Prix, and 2018 FIVB Volleyball Women's World Championship. She played CIS women's volleyball for the UBC Okanagan Heat for five seasons from 2011 to 2016. She finished her university career by contributing to the Heat's Bronze medal win in the 2016 CIS Women's Volleyball Championship.

On a club level she plays for TS Volley Dudingen.

References

External links 
 FIVB profile

Living people
1995 births
Canadian women's volleyball players
Volleyball players at the 2019 Pan American Games
Pan American Games competitors for Canada
UBC Okanagan Heat volleyball players